The Seversky Donets or Siverskyi Donets, usually simply called the Donets, is a river on the south of the East European Plain. The Donets is the fourth-longest river in Ukraine, and the largest in eastern Ukraine, where it is an important source of fresh water. It gives its name to the Donets Basin, known commonly as the Donbas, an important coal-mining and industrial region in Ukraine.

Etymology
The names Don and its diminutive Donets are derived from Iranic, Sarmatian  "the river".  Scytho-Sarmatians inhabited the areas to the north of the Black Sea from 1100 BC into the early medieval times.

In the 2nd century CE Ptolemy knew the river Don, into which the Donets flows, as Tanais, and Western Europeans recognized that the Don had a significant tributary which they called either the small Tanais or Donetz. The Slavic name of Seversky Donets derived from the fact that the river originates from the land of Severians. As the Italian-Polish chronicler Alexander Guagnini (1538–1614) wrote: "There is also another, small Tanais, which originates in the Seversky Principality (for this reason it is called Donets Seversky) and flows into the large Tanais above Azov".

Geography and hydrology

The Donets is the largest river in eastern Ukraine and the largest tributary of the Don. Most of the river's length  stretches across Ukraine.

These rivers are mostly fed by melting snow, and thus the water supply is uneven during the year. Excessive flooding is rare due to numerous artificial water reservoirs constructed along the river.

Tributaries and reservoirs
 Right bank: Babka, Udy, Mozh, Bereka, Kazennyi Torets, Bakhmutka, Luhan, Luhanchyk, Great Kamianka, Kundryuchya
 Left bank: Nezhegol, Vovcha, Khotimlia, Velykyi Burluk, Hnylytsia, Balakliika, Iziumets, Oskil, Netryus, Zherebets, Krasna, Borova, Aidar, Derkul, Glubokaya, Kalitva, Bystraya
 Water reservoirs: Belgorod water reservoir, Pechenizke water reservoir

Current

The right bank is usually high, sometimes with chalk cliffs, and is dissected by gullies. The left bank is more flat, contains numerous swamps, lakes and oxbow lakes, the largest of which is lake Lyman. The river is curvy, especially above the tributary river Oskil.

In the upstream, above Belgorod, the river contains several dams and small reservoirs. In the downstream, after the confluence of the Wolf River (Volchiya River), there is Pechenizke Reservoir (volume 86 km3), which supplies water to the city of Kharkiv. Below Pechenizke Reservoir, the Donets is fed by the Udy and by its largest tributary Oskil. There the valley widens and contains numerous oxbow lakes in its floodplain. Within Ukraine, the river flows between the Cisdesna plateau and the Donets lowland. In its middle, the river is partly fed by the Dnieper waters, which are brought though the Dnieper–Donbas–Seversky Donets channels which provide water to the coal industry of the Donets Basin (usually called the Donbas). Near the Russian city of Donetsk (Rostov oblast), the river crosses the Donets Ridge and flows in a narrow valley with steep and rocky slopes. In the lower part of Donets lowland, the flow is interrupted by sluices and is slow. At the delta it splits into three distributaries.

History

Pre-industrial era

The river played a crucial role for its ancient settlers as a source of water and food, means of transportation and trade route. The first archaeological evidence of settlers relates to Cheulean and Acheulean periods of Lower Paleolithic through stone tools (axes) found on the river banks near Izium city of Kharkiv Oblast and in Luhansk Oblast. Over the ages, the river banks were populated by tribals of various cultures, including Mousterian, Yamna, Catacomb, Scythian, Alan, Khazar and later Slavic cultures. Many of the related tribals had nomadic lifestyle characteristic of Kipchak people, Golden Horde and later of Cossacks. The river flows through the historic lands of Sloboda Ukraine as well as the lands of Don River Host. The many Cossacks became later assimilated into the strengthening Russian Empire, which had rebuilt and reinforced the fortress of Belgorod and cities of Kyiv, Izium, Luhansk, Chuhuiv and others in order keep defensive lines against the raids of nomads from the south-east. Later, the protective role of the river basin gave way to economic needs. In the 18th–19th centuries, the river was extensively used for watermills, which numbered by hundreds by the end of the 18th century, and the mill dams interrupted navigation on the river.

Industrial era

Industrialization in the 20th century shifted interests to mineral exploitation in Donbas, with water-hungry plants concentrated mostly in Kyiv, Luhansk and Donetsk. Already by the 1930s, Kharkiv, Donetsk and Luhansk were lacking water forcing the authorities to gradually create a network of canals and reservoirs. In 1936, the Kochetok Reservoir was created and coupled to the water system of Kharkiv. By the 1950s, this measure proved insufficient, and in the 1960s, Pechenizke Reservoir was constructed in place of the Kochetok Reservoir. It has with the capacity of 400 million m3 and provides about 75% of water consumed by Kharkiv. To supply water to southern Donbas and Donetsk, the 130-km long Donets-Donbas channel was built around 1958 starting near Raigorodok city, and in compensation, the Dnieper-Donbas channel was created to supply water from Dnieper River to the upstream of the Donets via the Bereka River. As a result of the industrial activity, the wild nature of Donets Basin transformed into an industrial settlement. After the breakup of the USSR, most of the basin territory became part of Ukraine.

Russo-Ukrainian wars

With the Russo-Ukrainian War, Luhansk Oblast is roughly split along the river between the Luhansk People's Republic controlling most of the portion of the oblast south of the Donets, and the Ukrainian government with the territory north of the Donets.

Around 8 May 2022, during the Battle of Donbas,Russian river-crossing attempts were commented as major tactical failures for the Russian army.

Navigation

At present, the Donets is navigable up to the Russian city of Donetsk (Rostov Oblast), 222 km from the mouth. Navigation on the last section is supported by six dams, built from 1911 to 1914. At the end of the 19th - beginning of the 20th centuries, a number of attempts were made to revive shipping, in particular, for the sake of the possibility of water transportation of minerals in the Donbass. One of the enthusiasts of the project was D. I. Mendeleev, who wrote about the need to “arrange the Donets […] for our Russian needs […] because the Donets, due to the importance of the interests involved in it, is most necessary”[39]. The developer of the project was the Russian hydraulic engineer Nestor Platonovich Puzyrevsky, known for his contribution to the Volga-Don Canal project. In 1903-1904, he conducted a detailed study of the channel of the Seversky Donets and proposed a project to restore the navigation of the Seversky Donets to the city of Belgorod, which involves the construction of a large number of locks were interrupted by World War I, Russian Civil War and lack of funds. The design of the dams and their old age slowed the navigation of the river, which is currently rather limited.

Environment
Being one of the largest rivers in Ukraine, the Donets is very intensively used in farming and industry.

Donets suffered greatly even back in the 18th century, when old oaks were cut down along its banks. The industrial development of the 19th century reduced the groundwater levels of the basin. This resulted in shallowing of the river and slowed navigation. Until the mid-19th century, the river was rich in fish which population rapidly declined since then. The water quality is graded as level IV (polluted) to V (dirty). The main pollutants are fertilizers, petroleum, phenols, zinc, chromium and copper. In Kharkiv Oblast, water is contaminated by industrial and communal wastes of Belgorod, Izium and Shebekino cities, but the water is partially purified through the Pechenizke Reservoir. The density of plants and thus the contamination increase downstream in Donetsk and Luhansk areas, especially around Lysychansk and Sievierodonetsk, about 400 km from the mouth. Some tributaries of the Donets, such as Kozenyi Butt, Bakhmut and Lugan are so polluted that consuming fish caught there is dangerous.
The purest segment of Donets is between the source and Belgorod, and between the Pechenizke Reservoir and Chuhuiv. Average water salinity is 650–750 mg/L, and it increases in winter to 1000 mg/L mostly due to industrial wastewater.

Flora and fauna

Fish 
The Donets hosts 44 species of fish, predominantly small fishes such as European perch, rutilus and common rudd. Medium and large species include bream, perch, catfish and pike and are becoming increasingly rare. Near Pechenizke Reservoir a large hatchery of carp has successfully operated since 1967.

Amphibians and reptiles

On the banks of the river, in the floodplain wetlands, there are abundant water frogs, toads (especially green toad), smooth and great crested newts and less common grass snake, dice snake and European pond terrapin.

Mammals
Human activities, mainly cultivation of the steppes, resulted in the disappearance of animals formerly common in the basin, such as tarpan, steppe antelope, saiga antelope, marmots and others. Back in the 1960s–1970s, especially near Oskil River, it was not unusual to meet bobak marmot, Eurasian deer, wild boar and Russian desman. Current mammals of the basin include European beaver, Dipodidae, suslik, mice, European otter, European mink, weasel and bats.

Birds
The number of bird species of the river basin reduced sharply over the past 100–150 years. The disappeared species include steppe eagle, tirkusha, sociable lapwing, bustard, black and winged lark. Less common are geese, swans, golden eagle, white-tailed eagle, peregrine falcon, honey buzzard and osprey. The reduction is mainly caused by the destruction of forests, especially old groves along the river banks. The creation of artificial forest belts (windbreaks) in the basin in the 1960s brought insectivorous birds new to this area, such as Streptopelia, European magpie and shrikes. From the traditional bird types, still common are several species of ducks, crows, Charadriiformes, Podiceps, great reed warbler and much less common are herons and storks. Only 12 individuals of demoiselle cranes remain in the area, near Sviatohirsk city. During the migratory season, the region is visited by greylag and black geese.

Flora
Banks of the river used to contain groves of trees, which were cut during the 18th–19th centuries. Some of the trees were used for shipbuilding during the Russian-Turkish wars in the time of Peter I. By the 20th century, most meadows along the river banks were converted into farmers' fields. Only a small part of the old groves remains, mainly in the Kharkiv Oblast. North of Izium, there are still broadleaf forests, and pine forests are found near Chuhuiv. Many species of wild plants survive near floodplain wetlands. These include willow, downy birch, alder and krushinnik. Along the river banks, there are cane, swamp horsetail, carex, kizlyak, swamp sabelnik and other types of grass.

Tourism

The Donets is regarded as one of the most scenic rivers of East European Plain and contains many hiking and biking routes along its banks. Canoe rafting is rather popular, especially between Zmiiv and Sviatohirsk. Rafting is of the first (lowest) degree of difficulty. The busiest tourism months are from May to September. The most picturesque part is probably near the town of Izium, which hosts a National Park of Holy Mountains. 
Down to Lysychansk, the water is clean for swimming, and there are many sandy beaches on the shores. Near Pechenizke Reservoir, there are several health resorts.

Gallery

References

Bibliography

External links

 Donets River at the Encyclopedia of Ukraine
 Site Seversk-Donets Basin Water Resources
 
 Северский Донец, Dictionary of modern geographical names

Google Maps satellite pictures 
 Source area in Belgorod Oblast. Merger of Sazhnoi Donets into Seversky Donets (flowing left down)
 Впадение реки Липовый Донец (слева) в Донец (течёт справа вниз). Белгородская область
 Merger of river Vezelka into Donets (flowing down) near Belgorod.
 Area near the Belgorod Reservoir
 Belgorod Reservoir and village Maslova Pristan
 Pecheneg Reservoir and a dam
 Lugansk area

International rivers of Europe
 
 
Rivers of Belgorod Oblast
Rivers of Donetsk Oblast
Rivers of Kharkiv Oblast
Rivers of Luhansk Oblast
Rivers of Rostov Oblast
Rivers of Ukraine
Donbas
Russia–Ukraine border